Chinese date can refer to:

Calendar dates
 Traditional Chinese calendar dates
 Modern expression of dates in Chinese

Fruit trees
Species of Ziziphus, particularly:
 Ziziphus jujuba
 Ziziphus mauritiana